Yangjae-daero is a road located in Gyeonggi Province and Seoul, South Korea.

Stopovers

 Seoul
 Seocho District
 Gyeonggi Province
 Gwacheon
 Seoul
 Seocho District - Gangnam District - Songpa District - Gangdong District
 Gyeonggi Province
 Guri

List of Facilities 
(■): Motorway section
IS: Intersection, IC: Interchange

References

Roads in Seoul
Roads in Gyeonggi